The 2016 California State Assembly election was held on Tuesday, November 8, 2016, with the primary election held on June 7, 2016. Voters in the 80 districts of the California State Assembly elected their representatives. The elections coincided with the elections for other offices, including for U.S. President and the state senate.

Benefiting from the large Democratic turnout due to the general election, the California Democratic Party made gains by ousting three Republican incumbents in the 60th, 65th, and 66th districts, thus regaining the two-thirds supermajority that they had lost in the previous elections.

State Assembly
California State Assembly elections
California State Assembly